Donald Marsh Middlebrooks (born December 31, 1946) is a United States district judge of the United States District Court for the Southern District of Florida.

Education and career
Middlebrooks was born in Orlando, Florida. He received a Bachelor of Science in Business Administration degree from the University of Florida in 1968. He received a Juris Doctor from the Fredric G. Levin College of Law at the University of Florida in 1972. He served as Student Government president during his time in law school. He was in private practice of law in Orlando from 1973 to 1974. He was an assistant general counsel, governmental assistant and general counsel for Governor Reubin Askew from 1974 to 1977. He was in private practice in West Palm Beach, Florida from 1977 to 1997.

Federal judicial service
Middlebrooks is a United States district judge of the United States District Court for the Southern District of Florida. Middlebrooks was nominated by president Bill Clinton on January 7, 1997, to a seat vacated by James W. Kehoe. He was confirmed by the United States Senate on May 23, 1997, and received his commission on May 27, 1997.

Notable cases

 Electronic Frontier Foundation vs. Shipping & Transit (2016)  Middlebrooks dismissed the case against patent troll Martin Kelly Jones (Case No.:16-CV-80855-MIDDLEBROOKS/BRANNON).
 Donald J. Trump v. Hillary R. Clinton, et.al:  Middlebrooks dismissed a 2022 suit brought by Donald Trump against Hillary Clinton, John Podesta, Jake Sullivan, Debbie Wasserman Schultz, and numerous other public officials, private citizens, and private entities, seeking damages for alleged conduct surrounding the 2016 presidential election.  Trump, as plaintiff, claimed that the "Defendants, blinded by political ambition, orchestrated a malicious conspiracy to disseminate patently false and injurious information about Donald J. Trump and his campaign, all in the hopes of destroying his life, his political career and rigging the 2016 Presidential Election in favor of Hillary Clinton."  Middlebrooks dismissed all of Trump's claims, concluding that Trump's complaint was not just inadequate in any respect but was inadequate in all respects, Middlebrooks concluded that "most of Plaintiff’s claims are not only unsupported by any legal authority but plainly foreclosed by binding precedent as set forth by the Supreme Court and the Eleventh Circuit." He also wrote that Trump "is not attempting to seek redress for any legal harm; instead, he is seeking to flaunt a two-hundred-page political manifesto outlining his grievances against those that have opposed him, and this Court is not the appropriate forum."  Id. The decision raises questions of whether Trump's attorneys may have filed a frivolous complaint, and the decision expressly reserves the right to consider sanctions against Trump's attorneys at a later date.

Just two months after issuing that decision, Middlebrooks did in fact issue sanctions. The Trump lawyers, Alina Habba, Michael T. Madaio, Peter Ticktin and Jamie Alan Sasson, were assessed $50,000 penalties, plus $16,000 to cover the legal fees paid by one of the defendants. In a later ruling, Judge Middlebrooks imposed additional sanctions of $937,989.39 on Trump and his lead law firm in the litigation, Habba Madaio & Associates. Middlebrooks' sanctions decision explained that lawsuit had been “brought in bad faith for an improper purpose” and had “needlessly harmed” the 31 individuals and organizations, including the Democratic National Committee, “in order to dishonestly advance a political narrative.” The judge added that Mr. Trump’s use of the courts had helped to undermine the public’s confidence in them. “A continuing pattern of misuse of the courts by Mr. Trump and his lawyers undermines the rule of law, portrays judges as partisans and diverts resources from those who have suffered actual legal harm,”

References

External links

1946 births
Living people
20th-century American judges
20th-century American lawyers
21st-century American judges
Florida lawyers
Judges of the United States District Court for the Southern District of Florida
People from Orlando, Florida
United States district court judges appointed by Bill Clinton
University of Florida alumni